Gallus are a Scottish professional wrestling stable consisting of real-life brothers Joe and Mark Coffey, and Wolfgang. They are currently signed to WWE and perform on the NXT brand, where Mark and Wolfgang are the current NXT Tag Team Champions in their first reign.

History

WWE

NXT UK (2018–2022)
On the first 5 December episode of NXT UK, the trio of Wolfgang and the Coffey brothers was officially dubbed Gallus (Scottish slang for daring or confident) during a segment calling out British Strong Style, as well as Travis Banks.

Gallus debuted during the December 12, 2018 episode of NXT UK, with members Mark Coffey and Wolfgang defeating Ashton Smith & Ligero in a tag match.

On the 4 October 2019 episode of NXT UK, Mark and Wolfgang defeated previous champions Mark Andrews and Flash Morgan Webster for the NXT UK Tag Team Championship, going on to hold it for 497 days.

After going on a hiatus for a short period of time, during which Joe Coffey was suspended by WWE.

After Gallus made their return, Mark Coffey won the NXT UK Heritage Cup Championship on the 23 June, 2022 episode of NXT UK; and Wolfgang lost to  Ilja Dragunov for the NXT UK Championship on July 23, 2022.

NXT (2022–present)
On NXT Heatwave, Gallus made their NXT 2.0  debuts, attacking Diamond Mine.

On 23 August 2022, Gallus made their tag team debut on NXT facing NXT UK Tag Team Champions Brooks Jensen and Josh Briggs, which they would go on to win via countout.

At Worlds Collide, Gallus became the second team eliminated from the Fatal four-way tag team elimination match for the NXT and NXT UK Tag Team Championship.

Gallus will go on to have a rivalry with Josh Briggs and Brooks Jensen, with the latter winning a No Disqualification tag team match between the teams. Gallus then later were suspended on September for attacking officials.

At New Year’s Evil on 10 January 2023, Gallus returned from their suspension and won a gauntlet match to become the #1 contenders for the NXT Tag Team Championship, which they won on Vengeance Day the month after.

Championships and accomplishments 

 Pro Wrestling Illustrated
Ranked No. 171 of the top 500 singles wrestlers in the PWI 500 in 2019 - Joe Coffey
Ranked No. 203 of the top 500 singles wrestlers in the PWI 500 in 2019 - Mark Coffey
Ranked No. 178 of the top 500 singles wrestlers in the PWI 500 in 2019 - Wolfgang

 WWE
 NXT Tag Team Championship (1 time, current) - Mark Coffey and Wolfgang
 NXT UK Tag Team Championship (1 time) - Mark Coffey and Wolfgang
NXT UK Heritage Cup Championship (1 time) - Mark Coffey

References 

WWE teams and stables
WWE NXT teams and stables